The Men's 1 m springboard competition of the 2016 European Aquatics Championships was held on 10 May 2016.

Results
The preliminary round was held at 12:00. The final round was held at 19:30.

Green denotes finalists

References

Diving